Millennium South is a dormitory and one of 10 housing options for students at The Catholic University of America.  Built in 2001, it offers suite- and apartment-style options.  With Millennium North, it houses 350 upperclassmen.

References

Buildings and structures completed in 2001
Residence halls of the Catholic University of America